Air Marshal (retd.) Jamal Uddin Ahmed is a former Chief of Air Staff, the highest appointment in the Bangladesh Air Force (BAF), and former Chairman of the Board of Directors of Biman Bangladesh. He was promoted to Air Marshal by then Prime Minister Sheikh Hasina on the day of his retirement from the BAF in 2001. Three years later, the Khaleda Zia government voided his promotion, declaring it unlawful because there was no such post in the BAF's  organizational chart. He appealed the decision to the High Court, which in 2008 restored his rank of air marshal, ruling that he had been stripped of it illegally.

Career
He started his career as a Martin B-57 Canberra attack pilot in the Pakistan Air Force in 1964. During the Liberation War in 1971, he was a Flight Lieutenant and part of a joint NATO-CENTO Air Intelligence Training Program for NATO Air Force officers in the United States. He returned to Bangladesh in 1972 as a Squadron Leader and served as a flight instructor at the Bangladesh Air Force Academy between 1976 and 1980. He was the Chief of Air Staff from 4 June 1995 to 3 June 2001.

References

 

1943 births
Living people
Bangladesh Air Force air marshals
Chiefs of Air Staff (Bangladesh)